Abantu Batho Congress is a South African political party established by businessman, Philani 'PG' Mavundla.

The party describes itself as an Afrocentric, Pan-Africanist and womanist revolutionary movement.

In January 2021, former Economic Freedom Fighters Gauteng leader Mandisa Mashego joined the new party.

The party contested the 2021 South African municipal elections, targeting Durban and the eThekwini Metropolitan Municipality.

Election results

Municipal elections

In the 2021 municipal elections, the party won 25 seats, 23 in Kwazulu-Natal, and 2 in Limpopo.

|-
! Election
! Votes
! %
! Seats
|-
! 2021
| 109,457
| 0.36%
| 25
|-
|}

See also 
South African politics
 African National Congress

References

2020 establishments in South Africa
Pan-Africanism in South Africa
Pan-Africanist political parties in Africa
Political parties established in 2020
Political parties in South Africa